The KGB of the Ukrainian SSR was a state committee of the Ukrainian Soviet Socialist Republic and a regional predecessor of the Security Service of Ukraine, a republican part of All-Union Committee for State Security. After the adaptation of the Constitution of the Ukrainian SSR (1978), it possessed a ministerial authority.

History
Created on May 30, 1954, according to the ukase of Presidium of the Verkhovna Rada|Verkhovna Rada Presidium, the committee completely corresponded to the authority and organizational structure of KGB (created on March 13, 1954). Procedural powers of KGB, and its investigative jurisdiction were identified with adoption of the Criminal (1960) and the Criminal Procedural (1961) Codes of the Ukrainian SSR. 

With the creation of the Security Service of Ukraine on September 20, 1991, the committee was dissolved according to the Verkhovna Rada statement "About creation of the Service of National Security of Ukraine". 

According to the statement, the KGB of Ukraine was liquidated, while its employees, archives and documents were now under control of Security Service of Ukraine except for the technical divisions for encryption and communications, and the guard service. The encryption and communication service was subordinated to the Verkhovna Rada, while the guard service was transferred to the jurisdiction of the National Guard of Ukraine.

Chairmen
Timofei Strokach (1953 – 1954)
Vitali Nikitchenko (April 16, 1954 – July 16, 1970)
Vitali Fedorchuk (July 16, 1970 – May 26, 1982)
Stepan Mukha (May 26, 1982 – 1987)
Nikolai Golushko (1987 – September 20, 1991)

See also
 State Committee of the Soviet Union
 State Security Committee of the Republic of Belarus
 KGB

Further reading
 Lubyanka. Handbook. VChK-OGPU-NKVD-NKGB-MGB-MVD-KGB 1917-1960. Moscow, 1997.
 Korovin, V. The history of domestic security agencies. Moscow, 1998.
 Kolpakidi, A., Prokhorov, D. Foreign intelligence of Russia. Saint Petersburg, 2001.

External links 
 Land Administration building. Web Encyclopedia of Kiev (WEK).
 Committee for State Security of the Ukrainian SSR
 Okipnyuk, V. Committee for State Security of the USSR and Committee for State Security of the URSR. Encyclopedia of History of Ukraine. "Naukova dumka". Kiev, 2007.

Ukrainian intelligence agencies
Law enforcement agencies of Ukraine
Defunct intelligence agencies
KGB
1954 establishments in Ukraine
Government of Ukraine
1991 disestablishments in Ukraine
State Committees of the Soviet Union